Supertourism or Tourism-1600 is a former touring car racing series held in Russia in 1995-2003.

History
Series starts in USSR in 1960s as A-1600. Base cars were VAZ-2101 and Lada Riva. After USSR dissolution series was abandoned.

In 1995 series was relaunched as Tourism-1600 with status Championship of Russia. In 2001 series was renamed to Supertourism. But budget and technical race of leaders reduced number of teams. After 2003 season 2 lead teams (Lada and Lukoil Racing) left championship. Series was closed.

Champions

External links
 Lukoil Racing Supertourism history 
 Autoreview newspaper archive 

Touring car racing series
Auto racing series in Russia